The  People's Party of Finland was a liberal political party in Finland.

History
The party was founded on 3 February 1951 after the National Progressive Party was disbanded. In the July 1951 elections it won ten of the 200 seats in Parliament, an increase from the five won by the National Progressive Party in 1948.

The party went on to win 13 seats in the 1954 elections, before being reduced to eight seats in the 1958 elections. The 1962 elections saw the party win 13 seats. In 1965 it merged with the Liberal League into the Liberal People's Party.

References

Defunct political parties in Finland
Political parties established in 1951
Political parties disestablished in 1965
Liberal parties in Finland
1951 establishments in Finland
1965 disestablishments in Finland